Tierra del Fuego (Spanish for "Land of Fire"), officially the Province of Tierra del Fuego, Antarctica and South Atlantic Islands (Spanish: Provincia de Tierra del Fuego, Antártida e Islas del Atlántico Sur), is the southernmost, smallest, and least populous Argentine province.

The territory of the current province had been inhabited by indigenous people for more than 12,000 years, since they migrated south of the mainland. It was first encountered by a European in 1520 when spotted by Ferdinand Magellan. Even after Argentina achieved independence, this territory remained under indigenous control until the nation's campaign known as the Conquest of the Desert in the 1870s, after which Argentina organised this section in 1885 as a territory. European immigration followed due to a gold rush and rapid expansion of sheep farming on large ranches in the area. Tierra del Fuego is the most recent Argentine territory to gain provincial status, which occurred in 1990.

Extent

The effective extent of the province is the eastern part of the island of Tierra del Fuego, Isla de los Estados and adjacent islands.

The province nominally includes Argentina's claims to the Falkland Islands and South Georgia and the South Sandwich Islands (which are British Overseas Territories) and to a segment of Antarctica that overlaps with the British and Chilean claims on that continent.  Argentina has no effective control in these territories outside its own Antarctic bases.

History

The youngest of the Argentine provinces was first inhabited around 12,000 years ago. When the first Europeans arrived, they encountered a population of about 10,000 indigenous people belonging to four tribes: Yámana, Alakaluf (now known by their autonym of Kawésqar), Selk'nam (Ona) and Manek'enk (Haush). Within fifty years of discovery, only about 350 natives remained due to high fatalities from the endemic diseases carried by Europeans, such as smallpox and measles, as the natives had no immunity to these new diseases. In addition, in the late 19th century, ranchers and settlers committed genocide against the Selk'nam. The provincial capital city is Ushuaia, from a native word meaning "bay towards the end".

The territory was first seen by Europeans in 1520 during Ferdinand Magellan's expedition. He named the area Land of Smokes (later changed to Land of Fire), as he saw what were probably the fires produced by the local Amerindian peoples for heating. Juan de Alderete in 1555 and later Pedro Sarmiento de Gamboa intended to found settlements in the area. The harsh weather and the constant attacks of British pirates, who took Sarmiento de Gamboa prisoner, frustrated their ambitions. 

Spanish, Dutch, British and French explorers ventured on Tierra del Fuego island and the nearby seas. Gabriel de Castilla passed through before exploring the Antarctic islands. In the early 1830s, Commander Robert FitzRoy, and Charles Darwin explored this land and other parts of Patagonia via .

In 1828 Argentina established a penal colony at Puerto Luis on the Falkland Islands. In 1833 the British sent a naval task force to request that the Argentine representative of the islands, José María Pinedo, and Argentine forces leave the islands, and re-established their rule there.

Luis Piedrabuena installed a base in San Juan de Salvamento on Isla de los Estados. The British South American Mission Society Patagonia Mission, under its superintendent Waite Stirling, founded Ushuaia as an Anglican mission in southern Tierra del Fuego in 1869. Shortly after, Salesian missionaries founded Río Grande.

In the 1880s the Argentine government took a more active interest in Tierra del Fuego. In 1881, the meridian 68°36'38 W was defined as the boundary between the Chilean and the Argentine portions of the island. In 1884 the Government of Tierra del Fuego was created, and a subprefecture was established at Ushuaia.

The southern part of the Beagle Channel was an issue of conflict between both states, which competed for control of three small islands, Picton, Lennox and Nueva. Finally in 1977, these were awarded to Chile by decision of the mediating British Crown, revised  by Pope John Paul II and ratified by treaty in 1985.

When the crews of sailing-ships told of the notoriously dangerous voyage round the tip of South America, Tierra del Fuego became a byword in Europe for an inhospitable land, where life would be impossibly harsh for settlers. But, it is not the most sparsely populated province of Argentina. Its population density of 4.75/ km2 is higher than five other provinces, due to various waves of immigration.

Gold fever started in Tierra del Fuego around 1883. Many Croatians from the Dalmatian coast arrived in search of gold. In addition, the gold rush inspired new technologies and innovations, such as the telegraph. Although by 1910 the gold had run out, most of the pioneers stayed. The inauspicious-looking northern plains proved ideal sheep-farming country, and vast ranches were developed. Croatian, Scottish, Basque, Italian, Galician and Chilean immigrants arrived to work on the estancias, with the hope of eventually buying their own land and stock.

The Amerindians suffered high fatalities from disease and the outright warfare waged by ranchers and bounty hunters; by 1920 their population on the island had dropped to only 200. News of the atrocities and genocide reached the Federal Congress in Buenos Aires. It sent aid and tried to help the Salesian mission, the only institution working in the island to protect the indigenous peoples.

With the creation of the Gobernación Marítima de Tierra del Fuego in 1943, construction of naval bases began in Ushuaia and Río Grande. An airport and other infrastructure were also built. These projects attracted immigrants from other countries as well as other parts of Argentina.

It was not until 1990 that the "National Territory of Tierra del Fuego, the Antarctic and the South Atlantic Islands" was declared a province. Its first governor was appointed two years later.

Geography

There are low mountains and sandy beaches at the north of the island, ascending to the south. The north is somewhat similar to the steppe of Santa Cruz Province. In the middle of the island, the end of the Andes mountain system becomes flattened, and its highest peak, Mount Cornú, rises only . There are a number of short rivers (the Grande, Moneta, Ona, Lasifashaj, etc.), and as a result of the low temperature there are many small glaciers that flow to the sea.

Due to its latitude, the island has a cold oceanic climate. The influences from the surrounding ocean and the predominant winds from the west result in the climate being uniform throughout the province. The strong westerly winds from the Pacific Ocean decrease the perception of the temperature (wind chill). In the extreme south in the Beagle Channel which is surrounded by mountains rising above , winds can exceed . Snowfall is abundant throughout the island. Much of this island can be classified as within the Magellanic subpolar forests ecoregion.

Government 

The provincial government is divided into three branches: the executive, headed by a popularly elected governor, who appoints the cabinet; the legislative; and the judiciary, headed by the Supreme Court.

The Constitution of Tierra del Fuego Province, Argentina forms the formal law of the province.

In Argentina, the most important law enforcement organization is the Argentine Federal Police but the additional work is carried out by the Tierra del Fuego Provincial Police.

Administrative divisions

The province is divided into five departments (Spanish: departamentos), only the first three of which are under the effective control of Argentina:

 Ushuaia (seat Ushuaia)
 Tolhuin (seat Tolhuin)
 Río Grande (seat Río Grande)
 Islas del Atlántico Sur: consists of the Argentine claim to the Falkland Islands (Malvinas in Spanish) and South Georgia and the South Sandwich Islands, both of which are self-governing overseas territories of the United Kingdom.
 Antártida Argentina: the Argentine claim to Antarctica lies between 25°W and 74°W (overlapping both Chilean and British claims) and is uninhabited apart from the staff of scientific bases. Being south of 60°S, the Argentine claim to the entire department is suspended under the Antarctic Treaty.

Economy
Tierra del Fuego has since the 1970s benefited from government subsidies to local industry and from its natural wealth. Its estimated 2006 output of US$2.6 billion gave the province a per capita income of US$25,719, the second highest in Argentina, behind Buenos Aires.

Manufacturing, despite the province's remoteness, contributes about 20% to output owing partly to generous certain tax incentives to local industry, a policy Buenos Aires has pursued to encourage immigration to less populated areas. A number of sizable factories have opened on Tierra del Fuego Island to take advantage of the tax benefits legislated in 1972, mainly home appliance and electronics manufacturers.

Recently, in the city of Río Grande, many international and Argentine companies, most notably the Korean company Samsung and the Argentine company Teltron, have set up factories that produce high-definition televisions (HDTV), CD-ROM-related articles, and low-cost GSM cell phones, built mainly from Argentine components.

Sheep ranching is the leading source of the province's modest agricultural income (5% of output). It provides wool, mutton and hides throughout the province and the wider Argentine market, whose taste for these products has been growing strongly.

As in Patagonia to the north, petroleum and natural gas extraction are important to Tierra del Fuego's economy, generating over 20% of total output. Exploration efforts continue. The government of the Falkland Islands has issued exploration licenses within its waters. This competition has caused anger in Argentina. The activity has also intruded into some of the area's lucrative crab and shrimp fishing industry.

Tourism is gaining importance on Tierra del Fuego island. The region offers mountains, glaciers, forests, fast rivers, waterfalls, ski centres (the most important is Cerro Castor), and the sea, all within short distances.

The most visited destinations in Argentine Tierra del Fuego include Ushuaia, the Tierra del Fuego National Park and the Tren del Fin del Mundo, Fagnano Lake, the Museum of the End of the World, the Beagle Channel, the Les Eclaireurs lighthouse, the old jail, and South Staten Island.

The Antarctic Peninsula is a tourist destination. Tourists can see wildlife at the Argentine Marambio Base during the summer.

See also
 1949 Tierra del Fuego earthquakes
 Argentine Antarctica
 Isla Grande de Tierra del Fuego
 South Georgia and the South Sandwich Islands
 South Orkney Islands
 Tierra del Fuego Archipelago

References

External links

 Tierra del Fuego provincial government homepage 
 Tierra del Fuego tourist information 

 
Provinces of Argentina
States and territories established in 1990
1990 establishments in Argentina